Space monkey(s) may refer to:

 Monkeys in space, monkeys launched into space

In music:
 Space Monkey (band), a 1980s British pop group
 Space Monkeys, a 1990s band from Manchester, England
 Spacemonkeyz, a group that remixed the Gorillaz album in 2002
 "Space Monkey", a song by John Prine from Live on Tour
 "Space Monkey", a song by Patti Smith Group from Easter
 "Space Monkey", a song by Placebo from Meds
 captain Simian & the Space Monkeys, an American animated television series
 Space Monkey (company), a decentralized cloud company

In other uses:

 A recurring element of the one million masterpiece collaborative art project
 A member of Project Mayhem in the novel Fight Club
 The working codename for Adobe Photoshop CS2
 The artist Dalek's most recognisable work
 A Cloud Storage device developed via Kickstarter
 Space Monkey (racing team), American Sedan (AS), pole position at the 2021 SCCA Runoffs at Indianapolis Motor Speedway